Sacha Treille (November 6, 1987) is a professional French ice hockey forward, currently playing in the HC Dynamo Pardubice in the Czech Extraliga (ELH).

Treille formerly played in Sweden with Malmö Redhawks of the Swedish HockeyAllsvenskan. Treille has also played for the Nybro Vikings and Bofors IK of HockeyAllsvenskan, as well as Färjestads BK of the Elitserien, the top league in Sweden, and the Brûleurs de loups of the French Ligue Magnus, the top league in France. Treille has also played for the French national team in several international tournaments. In 2007, Sacha won the Jean-Pierre Graff Trophy as the best rookie in the Ligue Magnus. In 31. May 2017, he signed a contract with HC Dynamo Pardubice. In Czech Extraliga he also played in HC Sparta Prague and HC Kladno. His brother, Yorick Treille, is also an ice hockey player, and has played for the French national team.

External links
 

1987 births
Living people
Bofors IK players
Brûleurs de Loups players
Expatriate ice hockey players in the  Czech Republic
Expatriate ice hockey players in Sweden
Expatriate ice hockey players in Germany
Färjestad BK players
French expatriate ice hockey people
French expatriate sportspeople in Sweden
French expatriate sportspeople in the Czech Republic
French expatriate sportspeople in Germany
French ice hockey forwards
HC Sparta Praha players
Malmö Redhawks players
Nybro Vikings players
Rytíři Kladno players
Sportspeople from Grenoble
Straubing Tigers players